Denver Zoo is an  nonprofit zoological garden located in City Park of Denver, Colorado, United States. Founded in 1896, it is operated by the Denver Zoological Foundation and funded in part by the Scientific and Cultural Facilities District (SCFD) in addition to ticket sales and private donations. It is the most visited paid attraction in Colorado.

Denver Zoo was started with the donation of an orphaned American black bear. With the construction of Bear Mountain, it became the first zoo in the United States to use naturalistic zoo enclosures rather than cages with bars. It expanded on this concept with Primate Panorama, featuring huge mesh tents and open areas for apes and monkeys, and with Predator Ridge, which has three separate areas through which animals are rotated so that their overlapping scents provide environmental enrichment. Toyota Elephant Passage, which opened on June 1, 2012, is divided into five areas for rotating the various species.

Denver Zoo is accredited by the (American) Association of Zoos and Aquariums (AZA) and American Humane and is also a member of the World Association of Zoos and Aquariums (WAZA). The zoo achieved ISO 14001 certification in 2009, was given the first AZA Green Award in 2011, and was named the "Greenest Zoo in the Country" at the World Renewable Energy Forum in 2012. In 2015, it was re-certified for ISO 14001 and achieved OHSAS 18001 certification, becoming only the fourth zoo in the world to get both certifications.

History

Early years
Denver Zoo was founded in 1896 when an orphaned American black bear cub named Billy Bryan – short for William Jennings Bryan after the contemporary American politician – was given to Thomas S. McMurry (mayor of Denver from 1895–1899) as a gift. McMurry gave the hard-to-manage cub to the keeper of City Park, Alexander J. Graham, who started the zoo with this animal. Other animals at the young zoo included native waterfowl at Duck Lake, native prairie dogs, antelope which roamed the park, and a flock of Chinese pheasants, which later populated the eastern plains of the state.

As this collection grew, the newly-formed park board continued to focus almost exclusively on acquiring native animals (with a notable pheasant collection and rhesus macaques as the exceptions) and some of the most popular animals at the park were large herds of bison and elk.

In 1905, a population of red squirrels was added to the zoo's collection; this population grew rapidly and decimated the bird population at Duck Lake. A plan to shoot the squirrels was scrapped when citizens protested. Instead, as many squirrels as could be caught were sent to the Denver Mountain Parks.

Mid-20th century
The zoo was a motley menagerie until 1906, when Mayor Robert W. Speer declared that the zoo's "[p]rison bars can be done away with" in favor of "concrete rocks, waterfalls, trees, etc." Speer hired the city's landscape architect, Saco R. DeBoer, to draw up the plans for his renovation and appointed Victor H. Borcherdt as zoo director.

Borcherdt designed the Bear Mountain exhibit, which opened in 1918. It was built of dyed and textured concrete forms cast from Dinosaur Mountain just outside Morrison, Colorado. Hidden moats replaced cage bars, and native plants and an artificial stream enhanced the natural look. The two main exhibits originally housed polar bears and grizzly bears. 

The south tip of the exhibit was designed to resemble Mesa Verde National Park. Originally it housed monkeys, but due to escape problems California sea lions were housed there instead. Between 1941 and 1961 it housed a female polar bear named Velox, who became the mascot of the 31st U.S. Infantry Regiment in 1952. Velox died at the zoo in 1961 and a memorial stone for her is displayed at the zoo. Bear Mountain established Denver as one of the foremost among American zoos, and the Saint Louis Zoo hired Borcherdt after seeing the exhibit.

Although other zoos in the region made extensive use of New Deal funds to upgrade their facilities, only one notable addition was made to Denver Zoo between 1918 and 1950. Monkey Island was built in 1937 using funds from the Works Progress Administration. Mayor Benjamin F. Stapleton funded the zoo very little, and it was in poorly maintained condition when Mayor Quigg Newton was elected in 1947. Newton hired DeBoer, the architect involved with the zoo's design forty years before, to plan a rebirth. Starting with the 1950 overhaul of Monkey Island, the zoo has steadily added to and improved its exhibits.

The Denver Zoological Foundation was created in 1950, the same year that the zoo acquired its first elephant, Cookie. A Children's zoo was opened in 1951 (since replaced by Primate Panorama). A perimeter fence was built in 1957, defining the zoo as a separate area but still within City Park. Automobile traffic in the zoo was finally eliminated completely in 1959. Pachyderm Habitat was opened the same year, and Cookie was joined by a second elephant, Candy.

The zoo opened the Feline House in 1964, a Giraffe House in 1966, and an Animal Hospital in 1969. Bird World was opened in 1975, followed by the Mountain Sheep Habitat in 1979, Northern Shores for polar bears, Arctic foxes, North American river otters, and pinnipeds in 1987, and Wolf Pack Woods in 1988.

The Marine Mammal Protection Act of 1972 made it impossible to keep the polar bears and sea lions in the Bear Mountain enclosure. This and its deteriorating condition lead to a $250,000 renovation of the exhibit starting in 1987 ($ in  dollars ). The exhibit reopened in 1989 with grizzly bears and Asiatic black bears occupying the northern two exhibits and coatis in the southern tip.

1990s-present
In 1993, the zoo opened the $11.5 million Tropical Discovery exhibit. Designed by the Denver architectural firm Anderson Mason Dale, this indoor tropical garden topped by glass pyramids is the aquarium and herpetarium of Denver Zoo, and its opening doubled both the number of species and the number of animals at the zoo. Along with the animals, 90% of which had never been on display at the zoo, there are over 250 species of plants represented in the exhibit.

On November 6, 1994, twin polar bear cubs Klondike and Snow were born to a first-time mother named Ulu, who rejected the cubs. They were successfully raised by zoo staff and became a popular attraction. The bears were transferred to SeaWorld Orlando. In 2012 Snow was transferred from Sea World in Orlando, Florida to the Reid Park Zoo in Tucson, Arizona, where she died unexpectedly on September 2, 2012. Klondike died at SeaWorld Orlando on September 13, 2013.  Their story is commemorated at Denver Zoo by a bronze sculpture located across from the main polar bear viewing area.

On February 24, 2007, a jaguar mauled zookeeper Ashlee Pfaff inside the animal's enclosure. The jaguar was shot and killed by the zoo's emergency response team while rescuing Pfaff, who later died of her injuries at a local hospital. This event occurred despite zoo policy prohibiting direct contact between keepers and big cats. An investigation by the zoo concluded the attack was the result of human error by Pfaff. For a short time in early 2007, the zoo's jaguar exhibit remained empty until the arrival of replacement jaguar Caipora. The zoo has not had jaguars since 2010.

In 2009, Denver Zoo was the first zoo in the United States to achieve ISO 14001 certification. City park rebuilt its greenhouses in 2009, and as part of this project was able to provide the zoo with its own dedicated greenhouse.

That same year, Denver Zoo celebrated the birth of an endangered aye-aye that was the first of the species to be conceived and born in a North American zoo. The zoo has continued to have a successful breeding program.

In 2010, the zoo, in cooperation with the City and County of Denver, drained Duck Lake in order to remove sediment buildup and improve its water quality. Duck Lake is part of  City Park but not part of the zoo. It is a major nesting area for black-crowned night herons and snowy egrets in the state. The nature walk along the lake shore was upgraded as part of the Asian Tropics project.

In 2012, the zoo opened the $50 million Toyota Elephant Passage. The exhibit was originally announced in 2006 as Asian Tropics, and bids for a general contractor were sent out in June 2009. The exhibit was constructed by the Kiewit Building Group and groundbreaking was on December 2, 2009. It was opened to the general public on June 1, 2012.

In 2015, following conservation work around Lake Titicaca in Peru, Denver Zoo welcomed 20 Lake Titicaca frogs from the Huachipa Zoo and later became the first zoo outside South America to breed the rare amphibians. Some have moved to other institutions in hopes of building a healthy captive population that can be released back into the lake in the future. In nearby Colombia, the zoo released Andean condors in 2010 and 2012.

Exhibits
Denver Zoo houses species from all over the world, including hoofed mammals, carnivorous mammals, primates, pachyderms, birds, reptiles, and fish. The zoo's animal collection contains 3,500 specimens representing 550 unique species. The zoo is laid out in a large loop, with exhibits both inside and outside the loop. Current exhibits include the following:

Primates
Tree-dwelling apes and monkeys live in open-air wire mesh tents that soar four stories high and cover more than an acre of ground. Inside these tents, primates like ring-tailed lemurs, Wolf's guenons, black-and-white colobus, red-crowned mangabeys, siamangs and black-handed spider monkeys can play and climb on twisting vines. Western lowland gorillas roam freely, climbing ropes and taking afternoon hammock naps in one of the largest gorilla habitats in the world. Sumatran orangutans have their own outdoor habitat where they can climb trees and swing in hammocks.

Jewels of the Emerald Forest pavilion is situated near the entrance to Primate Panorama. It features a meandering trail through diorama replicas exhibiting many small primates amongst other rainforest animals. Animals housed here include the aye-aye, pale-headed saki and golden lion tamarin. Connecting to the building is an island exhibit that's home to red-ruffed lemurs.

The nearby Shamba offers a view of a Central West African village and is home to red river hogs and mandrills. An aviary further down the trail showcases rhinoceros hornbills.

Monkey Island was built in 1937 with funds from the Works Progress Administration. It was rehabilitated in 1950. During the warmer months, it is inhabited by hooded capuchins. It is surrounded by a moat that also houses some aquatic birds, including white pelicans, in the summer. The moat is drained in the winter and the monkeys are housed in the Monkey House.

Monkey House, facing Monkey Island, was the original primate exhibit in the zoo and still serves as the winter residence for the capuchins.

Cats
Predator Ridge, completed in 2004 and the first exhibit most visitors encounter, is a large exhibit representing the African savanna. It has the ability to rotate multiple groups of Southern African lions and spotted hyenas, whose overlapping scents provide environmental enrichment for the animals. Other small African animals like dwarf crocodiles and leopard tortoises are exhibited in and around the Pahali Ya Simba pavilion. A habitat for African penguins, featuring a 10,000 gallon pool with underwater viewing, was completed in 2021 and is located directly inside the front entrance.

Feline House was built in 1964. In its heyday, lions, tigers, jaguars, cheetahs, Amur leopards, snow leopards, striped hyenas, fossa, red pandas, dwarf mongooses, maned wolves, northern tree shrews and bat-eared foxes called the building home. Much of the building is now closed and has been renovated in some areas to make way for Stingray Cove as well as exercise yards for animals in the zoo's education collection.

The Edge is a newly designed exhibit modeled after the pine forests of Russia for the zoo's Amur tigers. Two yards with large pools and pathways that wander over visitors' heads provide enrichment and exercise for the tigers. It opened to the public in March 2017, replacing Wolf Pack Woods, which opened in 1988.

Cats elsewhere include fishing cats and clouded leopards, both in Toyota Elephant Passage.

Hoofed mammals
Hoofed mammals are generally housed in the center of the zoo's main circular path. Species in the hoofed mammal yards include eastern black rhinoceros, Grevy's zebras, reticulated giraffes, Bactrian camels, okapis, yellow-backed duikers, Somali wild asses, a Vietnamese potbellied pig named Charlie, a variety of antelope species including eastern bongo, addax, lesser kudu and southern gerenuk, as well as Cape buffalo. Denver Zoo is also one of only a few zoos in the world to house a breeding herd of Przewalski's horses. Other species exhibited in the hoofed mammal yards include Abyssinian ground hornbills with the duikers, west African crowned cranes with the gerenuk, as well as red kangaroos and African wild dogs.

Giraffe House was created in 1966 and, along with the outdoor giraffe run, houses the zoo's giraffe herd.

Mountain Sheep Habitat was opened in 1979. It contains two natural-style "mountains" housing Rocky Mountain bighorn sheep and mountain goats.

Birds
The original aviary currently houses the bald eagle and Andean condor, and an attached building is the winter quarters for American and Chilean flamingos.

Lorikeet Adventure, the Nurture Trail, and the Avian Propagation Center all opened in 2006. Lorikeet Adventure is a large, open-air mesh tent where visitors can mingle with and feed a variety of lorikeet species such as rainbow, scarlet-breasted and coconut lorikeets; it is also the home of a blue-streaked lory, the only typical lory in the exhibit. The Nurture Trail is a short trail through a forested glade home to two exhibits: one for red-crowned cranes and one for grey crowned cranes. The trail then goes past smaller outdoor enclosures attached to the Avian Propagation Center, which provides Denver Zoo with state-of-the-art facilities for breeding and raising all types of birds.

The Forest Aviary in Primate Panorama is a  area richly landscaped and enclosed in a nearly invisible wire mesh. Visitors can walk around inside with the birds, which include (depending on the season) the Egyptian vulture and waldrapp ibis as well as a wide array of waterfowl.

Humboldt penguins are housed north of Bear Mountain.

Former bird exhibits included:

Bird Garden, an open-air mesh tent home to exotic birds including kookaburras, great argus and Cabot's tragopans. It was taken down on December 2, 2009, alongside enclosures for yaks, American bison, Mishmi takin, waterbuck, Ankole-Watusi cattle, muskoxen, Pallas' cats, mountain lions, reindeer and white-lipped deer, to make way for Toyota Elephant Passage.

Bird World was open from 1975–2019. Its multiple exhibits were regarded as some of the best indoor tropical rainforests in the country.

Tropical Discovery

Tropical Discovery was opened in 1993 as the zoo's herpetarium and aquarium. The building explores several tropical environments and displays mammals, reptiles, fish, amphibians and insects from these areas. The trip begins with a view into a South American river with different species of river fishes then continues to a cave featuring several bat species including the short-tailed bat, Jamaican fruit bat and vampire bat, as well as blind cave fish. A snake exhibit hidden inside a Mayan temple features venomous species from around the world including the snouted cobra, eyelash viper and neotropical rattlesnakes. Animals seen in the Rainforest area include the capybara, Linne's two-toed sloth, archerfish and an array of poison dart frogs. Further on, visitors are immersed in a coral reef with false percula clownfish, lionfish, queen angelfish, spotted garden eels and more. Around the corner, a gallery of North American snakes is located across from the alligator snapping turtle and other North American reptiles and fish in a large pool. Further on, the Siamese crocodile also enjoys a large pool near the Matamata turtle and the Discovery Room, which features other small species like the frilled lizard.

Dragons of Komodo was the largest Komodo dragon exhibit of its kind when it opened in 1999 and is still one of the largest Komodo dragon exhibits in the country. As well as housing Komodo dragons, Dragons of Komodo is home to other island reptiles like rhinoceros iguanas and giant New Caledonia geckos.

Toyota Elephant Passage

Toyota Elephant Passage is a $50 million  exhibit. At its opening, it was the largest bull elephant habitat in the world, designed to house up to 12 elephants, 8 of them bulls. This arrangement allows the zoo to conduct behavioral research related to the recent discovery that bull elephants (originally thought to be solitary) form loose bachelor herds in the wild when not breeding with matriarchal herds. The exhibit houses Asian elephants and other animals such as greater one-horned rhinoceros and Malayan tapirs, which rotate among different habitats in the same style as Predator Ridge. Northern white-cheeked gibbons swing directly over a boardwalk for visitors, traveling between three islands. Clouded leopards and sarus cranes live in nearby yards. The exhibit includes an indoor facility for smaller species like fishing cats, Asian small-clawed otters, great hornbills and green tree pythons and it provides important breeding facilities for the Indian rhino and Asian elephant in North America. 
 
The exhibit opened with two female elephants (Mimi and Dolly) and two bull elephants (Bodhi and Groucho). The zoo made history in 2013 by transporting Billy, a bull elephant from Belgium's Antwerp Zoo, via plane to the new exhibit. This marked the first time in over 30 years an Asian elephant had been imported into the United States and one of the few times the genetics of the European population would mix with the North American population. In October 2018, bull elephants Chuck and Jake came to the exhibit from the African Lion Safari in Ontario. This move made Denver's herd the largest Asian elephant bachelor herd in the world with five bulls.

On February 22, 2020, the first greater one-horned rhino calf in the zoo's history was born as the result of artificial insemination.

At its opening, the exhibit contained a waste-to-energy gasification system that allowed organic waste (i.e. uneaten food, animal waste, etc...) to be burned in an oxygen-deprived environment in order to create energy. The system powered outdoor hot tubs for the elephants and Denver Zoo's goal was to be "Zero Waste" by 2020, powering the whole facility with waste. Those involved with the project reported that no adverse byproducts would be released when the system was running but several surrounding residents were concerned that the gasification process would create an unpleasant odor around the zoo. These concerns resulted in ending the gasification project at Denver Zoo. Since the decision in 2015, the zoo is seeking partners to continue the project with offsite.

Nonetheless, the exhibit and its buildings have received LEED Platinum certification from the U.S. Green Building Council.

Harmony Hill
Harmony Hill provides a habitat for grizzly bears modeled after the fictional Harmony Hill State Park. A second habitat next to it is designed to resemble a backyard in order to illustrate and provide solutions for human-wildlife conflict. The second habitat is home to two rescued leucistic raccoons. Harmony Hill opened in 2019, making use of the former polar bear exhibit which opened as part of Northern Shores in 1987.

Northern Shores
This exhibit opened in 1987 and has continued to be a spacious and engaging home for California sea lions. Multiple pools, islands for sun bathing, underwater viewing windows and demonstrations provide guests with many opportunities to connect with the residents.

Pachyderm Habitat
Opened in 1959, the Pachyderm Habitat is currently home to Black rhinoceros and river hippopotamus. The Asian elephants and Malayan tapirs were moved to Toyota Elephant Passage prior to its opening in June 2012. As of summer 2015, the Pachyderm Habitat is also home to a special area for children called the Be a Zookeeper Zone where they can learn how to be a zookeeper or meet small animals from the education collection. Two llamas named Jorge and Fernando came to the zoo for the new area.

Bear Mountain
This historic exhibit, on the National Register of Historic Places and originally opened in 1918, is one of the first natural-style zoo exhibits in North America and the first to use simulated concrete rocks. It underwent a $250,000 restoration between 1987 and 1989. After Bear Mountain's grizzly bears were moved to a newer exhibit, it has become home to smaller species like cinereous vultures and a North American porcupine.

Stingray Cove 
Stingray Cove is a seasonal, interactive exhibit featuring an 18,000 gallon shaded open-air aquarium housing cownose rays, white-spotted and brown-banded bamboo sharks, southern stingrays, shovelnose guitarfish and bonnethead sharks. Guests are able to gently touch, feel, and feed the rays as they swim around the tank. Admission to the exhibit (which includes one piece of food for feeding to the rays) costs $5 in addition to zoo entry. The exhibit opened in June 2020.

Traveling Exhibits
Denver Zoo has hosted several traveling exhibits in recent years to raise awareness for conservation efforts. Traveling exhibits brought to the zoo have included "Nature Connects, Art With Lego® Bricks," "Washed Ashore, Art to Save the Sea" and "Dinos! Live at Denver Zoo."

Other facilities

The Conservation Carousel features hand-carved wooden replicas of some of Denver's most popular residents including a polar bear mom and cubs, giraffes, okapi and baby gorilla, along with many other endangered animals.

The Denver Zoo Railroad presented by Union Pacific offers a quick trip around the zoo's carousel meadow filled with beautiful lush foliage, under the shade of 100-year-old trees. Visitors can see American and Chilean flamingos and other waterfowl just outside the Primate Panorama exhibit. Denver Zoo Railroad is the first natural gas-powered zoo train in the United States.
 
The 4D Theater is located near the Asian hoofstock exhibits. The line visitors wait in displays artifacts, art and music celebrating central Asian culture and folktales.

The Helen and Arthur E. Johnson Animal Hospital was completed in 2021 and features one of the few CT scanners on an American zoo campus as well as double the space of the previous hospital built in 1969. The Schlessman Family Foundation Visitor and Education Center has windows onto a lab, surgical suite and treatment rooms allowing visitors to watch procedures.

The Gates Wildlife Conservation Education Center houses classrooms and meeting rooms for public and private (rental) use.

The Wild Encounters outdoor amphitheater is designed for wildlife presentations and is located just outside the Gates Center.

Education and conservation

Throughout the day Denver Zoo provides educational opportunities for visitors, including the sea lion demonstration, Toyota Elephant Passage demonstration, Predator Ridge demonstration, a variety of programming at both Wildlife Plaza and the Wild Encounters amphitheater as well as many other feedings/demonstrations. Some of these are seasonal, and some (like the flamingo talk every day during the summer of 2009) showcase specific animals that have been raised at the zoo.

In 2014, a paid, mobile app titled the Denver Zoo Audio Tour became available, providing zoo visitors with the ability to hear short, educational presentations about numerous zoo animals.

Denver Zoo is a part of Miami University’s graduate-level Advanced Inquiry Program (AIP). The program offers a Master of Arts in Biology or Master of Arts in Teaching through online coursework and face-to-face experiential learning experiences at the Denver Zoo. 

Denver Zoo is part of the (American) Association of Zoos and Aquariums (AZA) Species Survival Plan for many species. As an active member of the World Association of Zoos and Aquariums (WAZA), Denver Zoo works with other zoos and aquariums around the world to respond to the global extinction crisis facing the world's frogs and other amphibians. Denver Zoo works with conservationists in Peru to save wild populations of the endangered Lake Titicaca frog and Lake Junin giant frog. Amphibian experts with the zoo have had rare success breeding boreal toads, listed as endangered in several western states, and have released over 600 young toads in southwestern Utah. In 2021, the zoo and Colorado Parks and Wildlife partnered to launch a program aimed at increasing the boreal toad population of the state.

Denver Zoo also has a storied history with the American bison as it was one of the first zoos to assist in nationwide efforts to save the species from extinction. A breeding herd of five bison arrived at the zoo in 1899. The zoo no longer houses the species but manages a herd on the Rio Mora National Wildlife Refuge in New Mexico and also contributed animals to both the Genesee herd near Denver and the Heartland Ranch herd near Lamar. The latter herd, behaving naturally on thousands of acres and with the help of the Southern Plains Land Trust, almost entirely returned the ecosystem to its natural state as of 2019.

Denver Zoo's conservation efforts are coordinated by the Department of Conservation Biology. Through continued research and funding, the Department helps to conserve a variety of species worldwide. Although the zoo has been active in conservation and research since its founding in 1896, the establishment of the Department of Conservation Biology provides dedicated staff and funding to support hundreds of projects throughout the world.

Events
Boo at the Zoo is held every Halloween and is great fun for children.

Zoo Lights is open during December evenings. This is a spectacular stroll through a wonderland of lights, many of them animated and representing animals at the zoo.

Notes

References

External links
 
 
 Denver Zoo Audio Tour

Tourist attractions in Denver
Zoos in Colorado
1896 establishments in Colorado
Works Progress Administration in Colorado
Parks in Denver
Buildings and structures in Denver
Zoos established in 1896